Witt or WITT may refer to:

People
 Lefty Guise (1908–1968), American baseball player born Witt Orison Guise
 Witt (surname)
 Bobby Witt (disambiguation)
 George Witt (disambiguation)
 Robert Witt (disambiguation)

Places
 Witt, Illinois, United States
 Witt, Kentucky
 Sultan Iskandarmuda Airport (ICAO code WITT), in Banda Aceh, Indonesia

Other uses
 2732 Witt, an asteroid
 Museum Witt, the world's leading collection of moths in Munich, Germany
 Western Institute of Technology at Taranaki, a polytechnic in New Zealand
 WITT (FM), a radio station (91.9 FM) in Zionsville, Indiana, United States
 Witt (poetry collection), a 1973 book by Patti Smith
 Witt Weiden, a German mail order house

See also
 
 Wit (disambiguation)
 Witte, a surname
 Witts, a surname